Cleary is an Irish surname, which derives from Gaelic Ó Cléirigh/Mac Cleirigh, meaning 'descendant or son of cleric'. Notable people with the surname include:

Audrey Cleary (1930–2019), American politician and nurse
Bernard Cleary (1937–2020), Canadian politician
Beverly Cleary (1916–2021), American author
Bill Cleary (born 1934), American hockey player
Brendan Cleary (born 1958), Irish poet
Brian P. Cleary (born 1959), American humorist, poet and author
Daniel Cleary (born 1978), Canadian hockey player
Gabriel Cleary (born 1945), Irish engineer
Ivan Cleary (born 1971), Australian rugby league footballer and coach
Joe Cleary (1918–2004), Irish baseball player
John Cleary (disambiguation), many people
Jon Cleary (1917–2010), Australian author
Jon Cleary (musician) (born 1962), American musician
Mark Cleary (professor) (born 1954), Vice-Chancellor of the University of Bradford
Michael Cleary (disambiguation), various including 
Michael Cleary (rugby) (born 1940), Australian politician and dual-code rugby footballer
Michael J. Cleary (1925–2020), Irish bishop
Michael Cleary (hurler) (born 1966), former Irish hurler for Nenagh Éire Óg and Tipperary
Father Michael Cleary (1934–1993), Irish Roman Catholic priest
M. H. Cleary (1853–1933), American politician, lawyer, and physician
Nathan Cleary (born 1997), Australian rugby league footballer
Nikki Cleary (born 1988), American singer
Paul Cleary (born 1976), Australian middle-distance runner 
Phil Cleary (born 1952), Australian commentator 
Patrick Roger Cleary (1858–1948), founder of Cleary University
Russell G. Cleary (1933–1997), American businessman and lawyer
Sean Cleary (footballer) (born 1983), Irish football player
Sean Cleary (rugby league), Irish rugby league footballer
Siobhán Cleary (born 1970), Irish Composer
Thomas Cleary (1949–2021), author and translator
Timothy Cleary, (1900–1962), New Zealand lawyer and judge
William J. Cleary (1870–1952), American politician

See also
Cleary (disambiguation)
McCleary
Clary (surname)

Anglicised Irish-language surnames